Gononemertes is a genus of parasitic worms.

Species 
 Gononemertes australiensis Gibson, 1974
 Gononemertes parasita Bergendal, 1900

References

External links 

Prosorhochmidae
Nemertea genera